This is a partial list of Imperial resident ambassadors to the Kingdom of England.

 Bernardo de Mesa, December 1514 (first sent by Ferdinand II of Aragon) – March 1523
 Louis of Praet, May 1522 – May 1525
 Jean de le Sauch, February 1525 – August 1525
 Jean Jonglet, July 1525 – July 1526
 George of Theimseke, July 1526 – January 1527
 Don Iñigo López de Mendoza y Zúñiga, December 1526 – June 1529
 Eustace Chapuys, September 1529 – March 1539
 Philippe Maioris, March 1539 – September 1540
 Eustace Chapuys, September 1540 – May 1545
 Ferrante Gonzaga, 1543-1543
 Beltrán de la Cueva, 3rd Duke of Alburquerque, 1544-1544
 François van der Delft, November 1544 – May/June 1550
 Jean Scheyfve, May 1550 – October 1553
 Simon Renard, June 1553 – May 1555

Notes 
 Martin Lunitz, Diplomatie und Diplomaten im 16. Jahrhundert (Hartung-Gorre Verlag, Konstanz, 1988).

See also
List of ambassadors of the Kingdom of England to the Holy Roman Emperor

Holy Roman Empire
Ambassadors to England
England
Holy Roman Empire ambassadors to England
Holy Roman Empire ambassadors
England–Holy Roman Empire relations

de:Liste der Botschafter Spaniens im Vereinigten Königreich
pl:Hiszpańscy ambasadorzy w Wielkiej Brytanii